Rik de Voest and Scott Lipsky were the defending champions, but de Voest chose to not participate this year.
Lipsky partnered with David Martin, but they lost to Treat Conrad Huey and Dominic Inglot in the final 5–7, 7–6(2), [10–8].

Seeds

Draw

Draw

References
 Doubles Draw
 Qualifying Doubles Draw

Doubles